Đoàn Văn Hậu (born 19 April 1999) is a Vietnamese professional footballer who plays as a left-back for V.League 1 club Công An Hà Nội and the Vietnam national team.

Club career

Hanoi FC
He became a regular part of his club Hà Nội in 2017 when he was just 17, making him one of the youngest Vietnamese players to debut in the V.League 1. His performance was considered as one of the most impressive among youngsters in Vietnam. He won the 2018 V.League 1 and 2018 Vietnamese Super Cup with Hà Nội. He was also named in the 2018 V.League 1 Team of The Season.

Loan to SC Heerenveen 
On 2 September 2019, he joined SC Heerenveen in the Dutch Eredivisie on a one-year loan from Hà Nội. He made his first-team debut when coming from the bench at 89th minutes on 2-0 win over Roda JC in KNVB Cup on 17 December 2019, making him the first Vietnamese player to play in the Netherlands. However, that was his only game for the first team. He was mostly used in the reserve team Jong SC Heerenveen in Beloften Eredivisie, making 10 appearances overall and got one assist before this reserve league was eventually cancelled due to COVID-19 pandemic.

In August 2020, Doan Van Hau returned to Hanoi FC from a one-year spell with SC Heerenveen after the Dutch club and the Vietnamese football club failed to reach an agreement to extend his loan contract in the Netherland.

International career

U-19 and U-20 World Cup
Đoàn Văn Hậu made his first international appearance for the Vietnam national under-20 football team in 2016 AFC U-19 Championship at the age of 16. In the match against North Korea, one of Asia's major youth giant and runners-up of previous 2014 AFC U-19 Championship, he scored in an astonishing goal from distance as Vietnam registered their historic 2–1 win over North Korea, set up the historic journey as Vietnam would eventually make their first major FIFA 11-men football debut, the 2017 FIFA U-20 World Cup. In the U-20 World Cup, he didn't score any goals as the team exited with only a point.

U-22, to U23 and Olympics
Đoàn Văn Hậu's talents got himself promoted to the U-22, U23 and Olympic team in spite of his age. He made his debut on the U-22 team in the CFA friendly tournament in China, and scored a goal against Uzbekistan in a 1–3 defeat. He would later participate in the 2017 SEA Games, scored two goals but his Olympic team had to end up in poor note, being eliminated from the group stage.

However, his role became prominent in the 2018 AFC U-23 Championship. Although scoring no goal, he gave a magnificent performance, assisted for Nguyễn Quang Hải to score in the 1–2 defeat to South Korea and his tackles against Iraq as Vietnam advanced to their first final in any AFC tournament, which earned reputation by Dutch press as "Doan Van Bale".

In Vinaphone Cup 2018, he scored a trivela goal that helped his native Vietnam beat Oman 1–0.

Đoàn played a vital role in Vietnam's SEA Games 30 campaign, scoring two goals in a 3-0 victory against Olympic Indonesia in the final.

Senior team
Due to his impressive performances at youth teams, he was named on Park Hang-seo squad for the 2018 AFF Championship and played an instrumental role on helping Vietnam to gain the second title, assisting important goals for his teammates which made him one of eleven main players of the tournament.

However, it was the 2019 AFC Asian Cup, in which he was one of the youngest players in the tournament at the age of 19, that saw him earned reputation. His notable performance was against Jordan, where he prevented a number of Jordanian attacks as Vietnam marched to the quarter-finals for the second consecutive time. He was later named as one of 10 best young players at the tournament.

Van Hau appeared in all eight matches in the second round of 2022 FIFA World Cup qualification where he contributed significantly to the team success of reaching the final round of the qualifying process. However, his recurrence of torn meniscus injury forced him to miss the first two matches of third round against Saudi Arabia and Australia in early September 2021. On 13 September 2021, Hanoi FC confirmed Van Hau would undergo a comprehensive surgery in South Korea to completely treat the injury, which may last at least six months. Therefore, he must miss all 10 matches of Vietnam in the third round.

Career statistics

Club

International

Olympic

Vietnam

International goals

Honours

Hà Nội
V.League 1: 2018; 2022 
Vietnamese National Cup: 2020, 2022
Vietnamese Super Cup: 2019, 2021

Vietnam U19
AFF U-19 Youth Championship third place : 2016
AFC U-19 Championship third place : 2016
Vietnam U23/Olympic
AFC U-23 Championship runner-up: 2018
Asian Games fourth place: 2018
Southeast Asian Games: 2019
VFF Cup: 2018
Vietnam 
AFF Championship: 2018; runner-up: 2022
King's Cup runner-up: 2019
VFF Cup: 2022

Individual
AFF Youth Player of the Year: 2017
Youth Vietnamese Player of the Year: 2017, 2018, 2019
2018 AFF Championship: Best Eleven

References

External links
 

1999 births
Living people
People from Thái Bình province
Vietnamese footballers
Association football defenders
V.League 1 players
Hanoi FC players
SC Heerenveen players
Vietnamese expatriate footballers
Expatriate footballers in the Netherlands
Footballers at the 2018 Asian Games
2019 AFC Asian Cup players
Competitors at the 2017 Southeast Asian Games
Asian Games competitors for Vietnam
Competitors at the 2019 Southeast Asian Games
Southeast Asian Games medalists in football
Southeast Asian Games gold medalists for Vietnam
Vietnam international footballers